This is a list of Acts of the Parliament of South Africa for the years from 2020 to the present.

South African acts are uniquely identified by the year of passage and an act number within that year.

2020

2021

2022

References
 

2020